North Goa Lok Sabha constituency (formerly, Panaji Lok Sabha constituency) is one of the two Lok Sabha (parliamentary) constituencies in Goa state in western India along with South Goa.

Assembly Segments
Presently, North Goa Lok Sabha parliamentary constituency comprises 20 Vidhan Sabha (legislative assembly) constituencies:

Members of Parliament

Election results

2024

2019 general election

2014 general election

2009 general election

As Panaji Constituency

2004 general election

References

See also
 North Goa district
 List of Constituencies of the Lok Sabha

Lok Sabha constituencies in Goa
North Goa district
Politics of Goa